Philipp Heinrich Schupp (11 August 1911 – 10 May 1991) was an American male handball player. He was a member of the United States men's national handball team. He was a part of the  team at the 1936 Summer Olympics, playing no games.

Playing career
Around 1928 he played for TVG Großsachsen. Later he migrated to New York City and played for the German Sport Club Brooklyn. He was part of the 1936 Summer Olympics handball team of the United States. He was the sole player of the roster with none appearance at the Olympics.

Family 
He was the son of Heinrich Schupp and Elisabetha née Schumacher. He married  Gertrude Stuss 1937 in New York. They had two children Philipp P. and Rudolf P. (Rudy) together.

References

1911 births
1991 deaths
American male handball players
German male handball players
Olympic handball players of the United States
Field handball players at the 1936 Summer Olympics